These 111 genera belong to Haeteriinae, a subfamily of clown beetles in the family Histeridae. There are at least 330 described species in Haeteriinae.

Haeteriinae genera

 Aemulister Reichensperger, 1938
 Alienister Reichensperger, 1926
 Alienodites Tishechkin, 2007
 Alloiodites Reichensperger, 1939
 Amiculus Dégallier & Bello, 2008
 Anasynodites Reichensperger, 1935
 Aneuterapus Reichensperger, 1958
 Aphanister Reichensperger, 1933
 Aristomorphus Lewis, 1913
 Aristonister Dégallier, 1998
 Aritaerius Kovarik & Tishechkin, 2004
 Attalister Bruch, 1937
 Bastactister Reichensperger, 1939
 Brasilister Dégallier, 1999
 Bruchodites Tishechkin, 2007
 Cachexia Lewis, 1888
 Cheilister Reichensperger, 1924
 Chelonarhister Dégallier, 2004
 Chelonosternus Bickhardt, 1909
 Chelyocephalus Schmidt, 1893
 Chrysetaerius Reichensperger, 1923
 Clientister Reichensperger, 1935
 Coelister Bickhardt, 1917
 Colonides Schmidt, 1889
 Convivister Reichensperger, 1936
 Cossyphodister Reichensperger, 1936
 Cyclechinus Bickhardt, 1917
 Daitrosister Helava in Helava et al., 1985
 Daptesister Helava in Helava et al., 1985
 Discoscelis Schmidt, 1889
 Ecclisister Reichensperger, 1935
 Enicosoma Lewis, 1904
 Eretmotus Lacordaire, 1854
 Euclasea Lewis, 1888
 Eurysister Helava in Helava et al., 1985
 Euxenister Reichensperger, 1923
 Fistulaster Helava in Helava et al., 1985
 Glyptosister Helava in Helava et al., 1985
 Guianahister Tishechkin, 2007
 Haeterius Dejean, 1833
 Helavadites Tishechkin, 2007
 Hemicolonides Reichensperger, 1939
 Hesperodromus Schmidt, 1889
 Hetaeriobius Reichensperger, 1925
 Hetaeriodes Schmidt, 1893
 Hetaeriomorphus Schmidt, 1893
 Hippeutister Reichensperger, 1935
 Homalopygus Boheman, 1858
 Iugulister Reichensperger, 1958
 Kleptisister Helava in Helava et al., 1985
 Latronister Reichensperger, 1932
 Leptosister Helava in Helava et al., 1985
 Lissosternus Lewis, 1905
 Mesynodites Reichardt, 1924
 Metasynodites Reichensperger, 1930
 Microsynodites Tishechkin, 2007
 Monotonodites Reichensperger, 1939
 Morphetaerius Reichensperger, 1939
 Murexus Lewis, 1907
 Mutodites Tishechkin, 2007
 Neocolonides Dégallier, 1998
 Neoterapus Dégallier, 2004
 Nevermannister Reichensperger, 1938
 Nicolasites Tishechkin, 2007
 Nomadister Borgmeier, 1948
 Notocoelis Lewis, 1900
 Nymphister Reichensperger, 1933
 Opadosister Helava in Helava et al., 1985
 Panoplitellus Hedicke, 1923
 Parasynodites Bruch, 1930
 Paratropinus Reichensperger, 1923
 Parodites Reichensperger, 1923
 Paroecister Reichensperger, 1923
 Pelatetister Reichensperger, 1939
 Pinaxister Reichensperger, 1939
 Plagioscelis Bickhardt, 1917
 Plaumannister Reichensperger, 1958
 Procolonides Reichensperger, 1935
 Psalidister Reichensperger, 1924
 Pselaphister Bruch, 1926
 Pterotister Reichensperger, 1939
 Pulvinister Reichensperger, 1933
 Reichenspergerites Tishechkin, 2007
 Renclasea Tishechkin & Caterino, 2009
 Reninoides Helava in Helava et al., 1985
 Reninopsis Helava in Helava et al., 1985
 Reninus Lewis, 1889
 Satrapes Schmidt, 1885
 Scapicoelis Marseul, 1862
 Scapolister Borgmeier, 1930
 Sternocoelis Lewis, 1888
 Sternocoelopsis Reichensperger, 1923
 Symphilister Reichensperger, 1923
 Synetister Reichensperger, 1924
 Synoditinus Reichensperger, 1929
 Synoditulus Reichensperger, 1924
 Terapus Marseul, 1862
 Teratolister Bruch, 1930
 Teratosoma Lewis, 1885
 Termitolister Bruch, 1930
 Termitoxenus Schmidt, 1889
 Thaumataerius Mann, 1923
 Trichoreninus Lewis, 1891
 Troglosternus Bickhardt, 1917
 Tubulister Borgmeier, 1948
 Tylois Marseul, 1864
 Ulkeopsis Helava in Helava et al., 1985
 Ulkeus Horn, 1885
 Voratister Helava, 1989
 Wasmannister Bruch, 1929
 Xenister Borgmeier, 1929

References